The Hikurangi River is a river of Northland, New Zealand. A winding stretch of river, it can be considered an extension of the Kaikou River, being formed from the confluence of this river and the Moengawahine Stream.

See also
List of rivers of New Zealand

References

Rivers of the Northland Region
Rivers of New Zealand
Kaipara Harbour catchment